Hanoch Dagan is an Israeli lawyer, currently Stewart and Judy Colton Professor of Legal Theory at Tel Aviv University and formerly the Justin D'Atri Visiting Professor at Columbia Law School.

References

Year of birth missing (living people)
Living people
Academic staff of Tel Aviv University
Israeli lawyers
Yale Law School alumni
Tel Aviv University alumni
University of Michigan faculty
Columbia Law School faculty